Akasa Air, a brand of SNV Aviation Private Limited, is an Indian low-cost airline headquartered in Mumbai, Maharashtra, India. It was founded by Vinay Dube and Aditya Ghosh with investor Rakesh Jhunjhunwala holding a 46% stake in the airline.

The airline began commercial operation with its first flight service from Mumbai to Ahmedabad on 7 August 2022, after receiving its first Boeing 737 MAX 8 aircraft. The CEO of Akasa Air, Vinay Dube, stated that Akasa's goal is to have 18 aircraft by the end of 2022, and to add 12-14 aircraft per year. He also said Akasa Air's fleet size should be approximately 72 aircraft within 5 years. Dube stated that the airline will initially have services from metro cities to tier-2 and tier-3 cities, as well as operating flights to major cities across India. The airline currently has 19 aircraft flying to 16 destinations, with an order for additional 56 aircraft with plans to launch one more destination.

History
During March 2021, reports surfaced that Vinay Dube the former CEO of Jet Airways and Go First planned to launch a new low-cost carrier in India with former Go First Chief Commercial Officer (CCO), Praveen Iyer and Head of Flight Operations, Nikhil Ved. The airline will be a brand of the SNV Aviation Private Limited.

In July 2021, India billionaire trader Rakesh Jhunjhunwala invested  million for a 40% stake in the carrier. Aditya Ghosh owns 10% of the airline while Vinay Dube owns 31% of the airline. Rakesh later increased his investment in the airline to 46%. It received a No Objection Certificate from the Ministry of Civil Aviation in October 2021.

Logo and livery

On 22 December 2021, the airline unveiled its brand identity and logo, with the tagline It's Your Sky.

The symbol 'rising A' a part of their logo, was inspired by elements from the sky including the warmth of the rising sun, the effortless flight of a bird and the dependability of an aircraft wing. The colors of their brand  'Sunrise Orange' and 'Passionate Purple' were chosen, reflecting the airline's warm, youthful, and respectful nature. In early July 2022, the airline unveiled its crew uniform which was widely praised for its unique design. The uniform design incorporated a fusion of modern designs with Indian designs. It became the first airline to introduce sneakers made up of recycled rubber, and the first in India overall to introduce sneakers for cabin crew as well.

Commencement of operation
On 7 July 2022, the airline received its Air Operator Certificate (AOC) from DGCA after completing the required proving flights. On 22 July 2022, Akasa Air started Flight Booking on its website.

On 7 August 2022, the airline operated its first commercial flight between Mumbai and Ahmedabad with 28 flights per week. From 13 August 2022.The inaugural event was heavily covered by mainstream media and the Indian aviation community. Notable aviation enthusiasts, youtubers and bloggers from across the globe and all over the country like Josh Cahill, Sriram Hariharan, Utkarsh Thakkar, Dev Gandhi among many others flew on the inaugural flight.

The airline started another route, between Bengaluru and Kochi, with 28 flights per week. From 10 September, flights to Chennai was operated from Bengaluru. Initially, the airline will operate flights with two Boeing 737 MAX aircraft. With plans to add an aircraft every 2 weeks.

Data Breach 
On 25 August 2022, Akasa Air suffered a data breach. The airline on 28 August 2022 reported to the CERT-In that user information limited to names, gender, email addresses and phone numbers may have been viewed by unauthorized individuals however no travel-related information, travel records or payment information was compromised.

Destinations 

On July 22 Akasa announced its first destinations and opened bookings for them as well. The airline's first commercial flight was on August 7, 2022 between Ahmedabad and Mumbai. Most flights are operated through their operating bases at Bengaluru and Mumbai. The airline currently flies to 16 destinations, with plan to launch to one more destination. There are also plans to launch international flights by 2023 ending after completing the mandated 20 aircraft in fleet requirement.

Fleet 

, Akasa Air operates an all-Boeing 737 MAX fleet composed of the following aircraft:

Fleet Development 
On 16 November 2021, Akasa Air ordered 72 Boeing 737 MAX aircraft valued at nearly $9 billion in list prices at the 2021 Dubai Airshow. The order consists of 737 MAX 8 and the higher-capacity 737 MAX 200 variants. Akasa Air has partnered with Griffin Global Asset Management for a sale-leaseback agreement which includes 5 of their Boeing 737 MAX aircraft. It took the delivery of their first Boeing 737-8 on 16 June 2022. The airline currently has a plan to add an aircraft every 2 weeks.

Services 
Being a low cost airline, Akasa Air operates an all economy configuration in their Boeing 737 Max variants, with a total of 189 or 174 passengers in -8 variant and 197 in -200 variant. To keep fares at a low price, the airline does not provide any in-flight meal, however the airline operates Cafè Akasa, its own catering service where passengers can purchase food on board. The airline has no In Flight Entertainment system. The airline offers passengers the "Flexi premium services" where passengers get food, seat selection, priority and lower costs for date changes and cancellations. This service is similar to other Low Cost Carriers in India.

References 

Akasa Air
Airlines established in 2021
Indian companies established in 2021